Brother Michael SSF (Michael Fisher; born Reginald Lindsay Fisher; 6 April 1918 – 5 December 2003) was the second Anglican Bishop of St Germans in the modern era.

Early life and education
Fisher was born on 6 April 1918 in Streatham, London, and educated in Clapham. In 1978, he was awarded a Lambeth MA by the Archbishop of Canterbury.

Religious life
Fisher entered the Anglican Society of Saint Francis (SSF) in 1944 and took Michael as his religious name.

Ordained ministry
Fisher was ordained in 1954 after studying at Westcott House, Cambridge. He worked initially with the Student Christian Movement and was, successively, the Guardian of Alnmouth Friary, Minister General of the Society of Saint Francis and general secretary of the United Society for the Propagation of the Gospel (USPG). Fisher was consecrated a suffragan bishop in 1979.

Involvement with abuse

A 2016 Church of England enquiry reported that in 1978 Fisher had behaved inappropriately when a young man approached him concerning sadistic abuse that he had suffered from another clergyman. Fisher initiated an "intense romantic relationship" with the young man, who told the enquiry that he felt that it was not the right response to a young man looking for help. He commented:

Subsequent ministry
For a brief period Fisher deputised for the Bishop of Truro when Graham Leonard was translated to be the Bishop of London. He retired in 1985, serving subsequently as Minister General of the Society of St Francis.

In the last part of his life he lived at the Franciscans' house in Cambridge where he had a ministry as adviser and spiritual director to a large number of people and regularly celebrated and preached at St Bene't's Church. He published his memoirs, For the Time Being, in 1993 as Michael Fisher SSF (combining his name in religion with his surname).

His latter years were dogged by recurrent tuberculosis and he died on 5 December 2003.

References

1918 births
2003 deaths
20th-century Church of England bishops
Alumni of Westcott House, Cambridge
Bishops to HM Prisons
Bishops of St Germans
Society of Saint Francis